Katherine Bishop, more commonly known as Kate Bishop, is a fictional character portrayed by Hailee Steinfeld in the Marvel Cinematic Universe (MCU) media franchise—based on the Marvel Comics character of the same name. Bishop is depicted as a champion archer who grew up idolizing Avenger Clint Barton after he inadvertently saved her life during the Battle of New York. Years later, she meets him and partners with him to uncover a criminal conspiracy and becomes his protégé.

Bishop made her MCU debut in the miniseries Hawkeye (2021). Steinfeld's portrayal of Bishop has been well received by fans and critics. The character is expected to return in future MCU media. An alternate version of the character is set to appear in the upcoming animated series Marvel Zombies (2024).

Concept and creation 
Kate Bishop was created by Allan Heinberg and Jim Cheung for Young Avengers #1 (April 2005), and becomes a founding member of the titular team using Clint Barton's arrows as a weapon. Because Barton had sacrificed himself in Avengers #502, Captain America gifted her the Hawkeye mantle. Prior to this, as a teenager, she was assaulted in Central Park which led her to take up intense combat training and self-defense in order to heal from the trauma she felt afterwards. In later appearances after Barton's revival, she developed a mentor-mentee relationship with him and was a main eponymous character in Matt Fraction and David Aja's series Hawkeye (2012), the "All-New Hawkeye" series by Jeff Lemire and Ramon Perez (2015), a solo 16-issue Hawkeye series written by Kelly Thompson from 2016 to 2018 and an upcoming 2021 five-part miniseries by Marieke Nijkamp and Enid Balám.

Ben Pearson of /Film found it that Bishop's comic interpretation made her out as being "a young, headstrong woman, out to make a name for herself and refusing to take shit from anyone", and Renner relented that Bishop was "a better version of me and the sentiment of that is the fiber of what Hawkeye is, adding that he was delighted to shepherd an "amazing character" onscreen. He believed that Bishop's involvement in Hawkeye shows how Barton is "a superhero without superpowers and [how he gets to] teach someone else to be a superhero without super powers" in Bishop. Paul Tassi of Forbes stated that Marvel was "betting big" on Bishop's involvement in the MCU with her being a "force for them, perhaps bigger than [Renner's Barton] Hawkeye himself ever was."

Casting 

In April 2019, early reports were released indicating plans for a Disney+ Hawkeye property featuring Barton "passing the torch" to Bishop, which was later officially announced at San Diego Comic-Con in the following July. By early September 2019, Hailee Steinfeld had been offered the role of Kate Bishop, but had not yet signed on for the series a month later. Variety reported one reason for this was a non-compete clause in her contract with Apple TV+ for starring in the series Dickinson, something Variety felt Steinfeld would be able to negotiate out of. No other actresses had been approached for the role of Bishop. When asked about her starring in the series shortly after, Steinfeld said it was "not something that's necessarily happening", and was confirmed as Bishop by December 2020 in part due to scheduling issues with Dickinson season 3 being freed up due to the COVID-19 pandemic; this also allowed Steinfeld to better keep the secret until her official casting was revealed. Finn Jones, who played Danny Rand / Iron Fist in prior Marvel Television properties and co-starred alongside Steinfeld in season 2 of Dickinson encouraged her to take the role, believing that she should "'do it, definitely. Be a part of the Marvel world. It's such a wonderful thing to say that you've been a part of'...I was like 'do it, and you won't regret it.'" Jones furthered support for Steinfeld playing the role by saying "It's wonderful to see that she's now in that world...she deserves it. She's such an amazing performer – and a great contribution to the Marvel Universe." Hawkeye showrunner Jonathan Igla called her casting "absolutely perfect".

Renner took it upon himself to teach Steinfeld the avenues of a big-budget Marvel production and how the world of superheroes translates into real-life set pieces, feeling it was his role to introduce her to the MCU. "Outside of acting in the thing, I was protecting her and giving her the CliffsNotes on how it goes with this kind of filmmaking," Renner stated, adding that he "just wanted to protect her, because there's a lot of physical stuff" involved. He lauded Marvel's decision to cast her as Bishop, remarking that "she's a wonderful actress, a wonderful human...[there's a lot of] cool stuff that she's able to do." Steinfeld was already a fan of Bishop and the comics, but found that in her research for the show she was able to continually "[discover] these elements of Kate Bishop that are in [the comics] that we're bringing to life in the show, and other elements of the comics.” She was also appreciative of the way the character's role tied into and helped flesh out the MCU at large.

Steinfeld did not audition for the role, with Kevin Feige stating: "We were very, very lucky that Hailee was open to this because we very much believed that she was sort of the prototype for the character, and as occasionally happens, the dream version of the character agrees to do it."

Characterization

Traits and athleticism 
Steinfeld described Bishop as a "smart and witty badass" with physical abilities that are "through the roof". To prepare herself for Bishop's athletic prowess, she was trained in basic archery sessions. When she is introduced into the show, Bishop is a 22-year-old fangirl of Barton's who has a "wonderfully annoying and equally charming manner about her.” The relationship between her and Barton was described as chaotic from the "onslaught of problems" she brings into his life initially, but also a growing mutual respect for one another as she formally becomes Barton's protégée. She first draws Barton's attention when she is pictured on television disguised as Ronin, Barton's previous mercenary alter ego. Steinfeld said that Bishop was "very human...rooted in human strength and strength of mind. She's self-taught, very disciplined, and very determined." She likened the character to Emily Dickinson, who she had been portraying right before filming Hawkeye, in that Bishop is also a "strong and determined and independent and driven female character" so the move from one character to another felt smooth. She would later call Bishop "a character that I would have loved to have had growing up — somebody who is completely ambitious, driven and disciplined, and takes it upon herself to do whatever it is she has to do to achieve her goals."

Steinfeld's casting in the series and training led her to develop a passion for archery, much like the character she portrays. Of this, she said: "As far as a bow and arrow goes...it's something that I genuinely, really enjoy. Not something I’ve ever picked up, a bow, before this project...[but] it's truly therapeutic and just really amazing. Not something I'd ever see myself doing. But here I am! And I absolutely love it." In reaction to set photos of the film, Taylor Walston of Archery360 commented that "Steinfeld's form is solid. Her fingers on the bowstring are nice and relaxed, and she is loosely holding the grip between her thumb and first finger, with her other fingers relaxed, in an early demonstration of proper form."

Relationship with Barton 
Renner likened her and Barton's dynamic to a father-daughter relationship, particularly between Barton and his own daughter Lila Barton. Steinfeld added that "It was very fun to implement the banter [between Barton and Bishop]...that was something Jeremy and I found very quickly...there are these tragic events taking place and there's still this witty, quick banter that they seem to find." In changing Bishop's backstory and events surrounding her initial meeting with Barton, Steinfeld said that " [This version of] Kate, as a young woman growing up in New York City, can walk down the street and own herself and her strength. She can take anybody on, and [we wanted that to be] because she decided for herself that that was something she wanted to be able to do." Detailing their unique dynamic, Igla added that "I'm always interested in contrasts, and Kate and Clint are a real study in contrasts...they're opposites. Kate aspires to be a superhero, as opposed to Clint who is a superhero and doesn't want to be one. And I felt like if somebody was going to come along and teach an aspiring superhero about what it means to be a superhero, about the reality of it, it should be somebody who has a much more ambivalent relationship to it." Touching on the choice to include the show's opening sequence where Bishop watches Barton during the Battle of New York, Igla stated: "I wanted to pair the death of Kate's father with her seeing Hawkeye. Because the trauma of losing a parent, and also an alien invasion right outside your window...[is a] traumatizing event. Seeing [Barton] who is not out of control in that moment, but seems completely in control...[for] Kate, somebody who doesn't have superpowers, that felt like the type of thing that would make a lifelong lasting mark on a child."

Executive producer Trinh Tran called Barton Bishop's "North Star", adding that "from a young age, Kate [has had a] love for her idol, Hawkeye." Her motivation to become a hero was due to seeing how Barton could be "a hero and a mere human doing superhuman things, but above everything else, he always stands up for the little guy and protects those in need" which led her to "put herself through intense training, studying various sports, including archery and martial arts." Of their back-and-forth relationship, TVLine called it full of "action and punchy tête-à-têtes" with extra notice of its similarity to the Aja and Fraction Hawkeye run that partially inspired the show.

Relationship with Eleanor 
Of Bishop's mother Eleanor, it was stated that Eleanor would be "pretty evil; and she doesn't appear to have a whit of ’80s frumpy ex-nun to her character...she's just going to be a wealthy, amoral jerk" leading to a rift in their relationship. Tranh offered insight into the decision to include Bishop's mother in the show, saying that "we haven't had many opportunities to explore a mother-daughter relationship in the MCU...I find interesting is that there is a lot of, I guess, fresh territory that we can go to for the relationship for the two of them." Furthering her comments, she added that "[Eleanor] thinks she knows what is best for Kate, but Kate is you’ve seen in the comics is sometimes hard-headed, and she speaks her mind...there could be opposing opinions in who she is...[there is a] more personal, more emotional [connection] between the two characters that we wanted to explore." After the realization that Eleanor was working with Kingpin and ordered Barton's assassination at the hands of Yelena Belova, Steinfeld called Bishop's state "completely broken and confused and absolutely lost. She doesn't know who to trust or who to look to...the one person that she's been tirelessly trying to protect is now someone that she might need to be protected against." Touching on Bishop's encounter with Kingpin, Steinfeld said: "If it didn't feel real before, it's real now. After all the partner talk and jokes that have been thrown around, now she has the opportunity to step up to the plate [and] come to her senses as quickly as she possibly can after learning this information and puts her head down and does what she has to do."

Fictional character biography

Early life 

Bishop was born an heiress to the wealthy Bishop family of New York City, headed by her mother Eleanor and father Derek. In 2012, she witnessed Clint Barton fighting against Chitauri troops during the Battle of New York. During the invasion, Derek is killed. At his funeral, Bishop vowed to become a hero like Barton, which led to her training in archery, fencing, gymnastics and martial arts. In 2018, she survives the Blip.

Partnering with Clint Barton 

In the week leading up to Christmas 2024, Bishop attends a charity auction gala with her mother, the head of Bishop Security. She learns her mother is engaged to Jack Duquesne. During the gala, she discovers an underground black market auction selling remnants from the destroyed Avengers Compound with Jack and his uncle Armand Duquesne III in attendance. The Tracksuit Mafia interrupt the auction and Kate fights them by donning the Ronin suit to hide her identity. She manages to escape, but is recognized by Kazi of the Tracksuit Mafia. She also discovers that Armand III was murdered. After recovering a dog from traffic, she meets Barton, who confronts her about the Ronin suit. They take refuge in Bishop's apartment but are ambushed by the Tracksuits, which leads her and Barton to take refuge in Bishop's aunt's apartment. She becomes suspicious of Jack and discovers that he is an expert swordsman, leading her to believe he killed Armand III. After Barton is kidnapped by the Tracksuits, she unsuccessfully attempts to save him and gets captured herself.

Barton and Bishop are confronted by Maya Lopez, the Tracksuits' boss who is seeking revenge for the murder of her father at the hands of Ronin. She and Barton manage to escape after a car chase in which she uses Barton's trick arrows to fend off the Tracksuits. They arrive at Eleanor's apartment and Bishop accesses Bishop Security's criminal database, finding that the Tracksuits are connected to a shell company called Sloane Limited.

Discovering the truth 
With the help of Laura Barton, Clint's wife, Bishop and Clint find out that Jack is the CEO of Sloane Limited. Bishop deduces that Barton is Ronin, but quickly forgives him when she realizes the pain he felt after losing his family during the Blip. Barton and Bishop break into Lopez's apartment to locate a watch stolen at the auction, but are confronted by Lopez and Black Widow assassin Yelena Belova. Barton cuts ties with Bishop when he realizes how dangerous their situation has gotten. At her apartment, Bishop is confronted by Belova, who reveals that she was hired to kill Barton. Belova attempts to convince Bishop that Barton is not the hero that Bishop worships, but Bishop rebuffs this. Later, she helps Barton fight off Lopez and convene at the apartment of Grills, a LARPer who they have entrusted. She is sent a message from Belova telling her that Eleanor arranged Barton's death and that she has partnered with Wilson Fisk, the head of organized crime in New York City.

Defeating the Tracksuits 

Bishop and Barton attend a Christmas party hosted by Eleanor, where she is confronted by Belova, who still intends to kill Barton as revenge for the death of Natasha Romanoff. After saving Barton, she finds her mother, who cut ties with Fisk in order to keep her safe. Bishop fights Fisk and knocks him out with explosive arrows. She and Barton, as well as Jack and the LARPers fight off the Tracksuits while Belova decides to not kill Barton. Eleanor is arrested for the murder of Armand III, while Bishop finds it hard to reconcile with her mother despite knowing everything Eleanor did was for her. Later, at the Barton family farm, she and Barton burn the Ronin suit and try to find a hero name for her.

Reception 
Initial reception for Hawkeye's first two episodes included heavy praise towards Steinfeld's portrayal of Bishop, about how she "[brought] the humor and the determination to her character" with comments from critics ranging from saying that there is "no chance fans don't immediately fall in love with her character" by Steve Weintraub from Collider to other varied comments saying that "Eager Kate's dynamic with grumpy Clint is especially great" and her "energized" performance. Erik Kain of Forbes said that "Hailee Steinfeld is great as Kate Bishop. Last thing I saw her in was Bumblebee... [and here] she's a little more confident and self-assured and more of a badass, and she does all that very well."

Matt Purslow from IGN, in a review for Hawkeye's first two episodes, said that Bishop is "a delightfully energetic force who runs before she can walk. Her archery skills are matched only by her ability to arrive in the wrong place at the wrong time" and praised the show's faithfulness to her comic book counterpart. He said that  Bishop  "steals the show — Steinfeld['s performance is] a magnetic joy — but her junior hero also fires significantly more arrows over the premiere, both physically and metaphorically" while taking note of the strong Barton-Bishop dynamic. In his review of "Ronin", Purslow also lauded the banter between Bishop and Belova in their first meeting. In a review for "Ronin", Alan Sepinwall of Rolling Stone took note of Bishop's idol worship of Barton and how upon discovering Barton was Ronin she still stands by him, adding that the character was layered by the way she "is not so different from Clint and Maya, either, in that she can also be blinded and manipulated." In a review for Hawkeye episode 4, "Partners, Am I Right?", Chancellor Agard commended the growing character dynamics between Barton and Bishop, and how Barton has come to care for her while Bishop learns more about the darker side of her mentor's past.

Accolades

See also 
 Characters of the Marvel Cinematic Universe

References

External links 

American female characters in television
Female characters in television
Fictional archers
Fictional characters from Manhattan
Fictional female martial artists
Fictional fencers
Fictional genocide survivors
Fictional gymnasts
Fictional people from the 21st-century
Fictional vigilantes
Hailee Steinfeld
Hawkeye (2021 TV series)
Marvel Cinematic Universe characters
Marvel Comics American superheroes
Marvel Comics female superheroes
Marvel Comics martial artists
Superhero television characters
Television characters introduced in 2021